Caro Michele is a 1976 Italian comedy film directed by Mario Monicelli. It was entered into the 26th Berlin International Film Festival, where  Monicelli won the Silver Bear for Best Director.

Cast
 Mariangela Melato as Mara Castorelli
 Delphine Seyrig as Adriana Vivanti, the mother
 Aurore Clément as Angelica Vivanti
 Lou Castel as Osvaldo
 Fabio Carpi as Fabio Colarosa
 Marcella Michelangeli as Viola Vivanti
 Alfonso Gatto as Vivanti padre
 Eriprando Visconti as Filippo
 Isa Danieli as Livia, Mara's friend
 Renato Romano as Oreste, Angelica's husband
 Giuliana Calandra as Ada, Osvaldo's wife
 Costantino Carrozza as Livia's Husband
 Luca Dal Fabbro as Ray
 Adriana Innocenti as Matilde, Adriana's sister-in-law
 Loredana Martínez as Mara's Cousin
 Eleonora Morana as Colarosa's Servant
 Alfredo Pea as Livia's Brother-in-Law

References

External links
 

1976 films
1976 comedy-drama films
Italian comedy-drama films
Films scored by Nino Rota
1970s Italian-language films
Films directed by Mario Monicelli
Films with screenplays by Tonino Guerra
Films with screenplays by Suso Cecchi d'Amico
1970s Italian films